Branchville is an unincorporated community located in Milam County, Texas, United States. Branchville is located approximately 13 miles east of Cameron and ten miles west of Hearne. 

It is believed to have received its name as being a branch store of the Port Sullivan store of W. B. Easterwood. The post office opened in 1878 and closed in 1908.

Notable people from Branchville include Kansas City barbecue icon Arthur Bryant who operated Arthur Bryant's and who is buried and Branchville.

References

External links
 Texascapes History

Unincorporated communities in Milam County, Texas
Unincorporated communities in Texas